Robert Anthony Robinson (1904–1979) was a New Zealand inorganic chemist, best known for his book Electrolyte solutions book, which has been a standard for decades. In 1949 he won the Hector Medal from the Royal Society of New Zealand.

Selected works
 Electrolyte solutions, the measurement and interpretation of conductance, chemical potential, and diffusion in solutions of simple electrolytes R A Robinson and R H Stokes, 1955.  London: Butterworths Scientific Publications
 Electrolyte solutions, the measurement and interpretation of conductance, chemical potential, and diffusion in solutions of simple electrolytes R A Robinson and R H Stokes, 1970. Second edition London: Butterworths Scientific Publications  
 Electrolyte solutions, the measurement and interpretation of conductance, chemical potential, and diffusion in solutions of simple electrolytes R A Robinson and R H Stokes, 2002 Second edition

References

External links
 google scholar

New Zealand academics
New Zealand chemists
1904 births
1979 deaths
New Zealand academics lacking usual sources
20th-century New Zealand scientists